Ethiopic Supplement is a Unicode block containing extra Geʽez characters for writing the Sebatbeit language, and Ethiopic tone marks.

Block

History
The following Unicode-related documents record the purpose and process of defining specific characters in the Ethiopic Supplement block:

References 

Unicode blocks